Manuel Mancini (born 27 June 1983) is an Italian footballer who last played for Messina.

Biography

Early career

Siena
Although he was never utilized in league play, he was a member of Siena squad in 2008–09 Serie A. He was signed from Taranto Sport in January 2008 along with Antonio Zito. They remained in Taranto until 30 June 2008. The transfer cost Siena €50,000 (Mancini) and €207,000 (Zito) respectively.

He made his Serie B debut with Gallipoli in the 2009–10 season.

Verona 
Mancini was sold to Hellas Verona F.C. in a co-ownership deal for €2,000 on 15 July 2010. Mancini made his debut in a friendly match on 18 July.

In 2010–11 he was a key player for Verona squad that was promoted to Serie B after four seasons in Lega Pro Prima Divisione. In June 2011 Verona acquired Mancini outright for a nominal fee of €500.

On 13 February 2012 Mancini extended his contract to 30 June 2014.

Salernitana
On 31 August 2012 he moved on loan to the Lega Pro Seconda Divisione club Salernitana.

He was released by Verona on 30 August 2013 On 13 November he re-joined Salernitana.

L'Aquila
In summer 2014 Mancini was signed by L'Aquila. On 5 January 2015 Mancini was signed by Messina in a temporary deal. He received pre-season call-up for L'Aquila in 2015–16 season.

Messina
On 9 September 2016 Mancini re-joined Messina.

References

External links 
 
 Hellastory.net Player Profile 
 AIC profile (data by football.it) 

Italian footballers
S.S. Lazio players
F.C. Südtirol players
Taranto F.C. 1927 players
A.C.N. Siena 1904 players
A.S.D. Gallipoli Football 1909 players
Hellas Verona F.C. players
U.S. Salernitana 1919 players
Association football midfielders
Footballers from Rome
1983 births
Living people